Palaeomolis metarhoda is a moth of the subfamily Arctiinae. It was described by Paul Dognin in 1910. It is found in Ecuador.

References

Arctiini
Moths described in 1910